The following is a list of clubs that played in the United Soccer Leagues 2nd Division (USL-2) at any time since its formation in 1990 to the 2010 season, including during its years operating under other names. USL-2 teams that played in the 2010 season are indicated in bold.

Complete list of current and former member clubs